Theodore Scott Yoho (born April 13, 1955) is an American politician, veterinarian, and businessman who served as the U.S. representative from  from 2013 until 2021. He is a member of the Republican Party.

In the 2012 Republican primary election for the district, Yoho pulled a major upset against long-term incumbent Congressman Cliff Stearns, who had first been elected in 1988. Prior to being elected to Congress, Yoho had been a veterinarian and small business owner in North Central Florida for 30 years.

In December 2019, Yoho announced that, honoring his term-limit pledge, he would not run for re-election to Congress in 2020.

Early life, education, and veterinarian career
Yoho was born in Minneapolis, Minnesota, on April 13, 1955. At age 11, he moved with his family to Florida, where he attended school with his future wife, Carolyn, in the 4th grade.

Yoho earned his AA degree at Broward Community College. He earned a baccalaureate in animal science at the University of Florida in 1983 and thereafter attended the University of Florida College of Veterinary Medicine, from which he received a doctorate in veterinary medicine. He is a member of the American Veterinary Medical Association, Florida Veterinary Medical Association, Florida Association of Equine Practitioners, Florida Cattlemen's Association, and the National Rifle Association of America.

U.S. House of Representatives

2012 election

Yoho ran for the newly redrawn . In the Republican primary he defeated longtime incumbent U.S. Congressman Cliff Stearns (who was first elected in 1988), State Senator Steve Oelrich, and Clay County Clerk of Court James Jett 34%–33%–19%–14%. Yoho defeated Stearns by 829 votes, or a 1.1 percentage point margin. Yoho won 11 of the district's 13 counties.

Yoho won the November general election, 65% to 32%, against Democratic candidate J.R. Gaillot.

Tenure

Yoho took office on January 3, 2013. He is a member of the Tea Party Caucus and the House Liberty Caucus. He says that he supports reduction in taxes: replacing the current tax code with the Fair Tax (a broad national consumption tax on retail sales), reducing corporate tax rates, and eliminating federal programs that cannot be balanced with revenues. According to the CBO, there would still be a deficit even if all discretionary spending (all Federal programs except pensions, Medicare and Social Security) were stopped. Yoho advocates reducing spending and taxes, though has not yet introduced a plan that will lead to a balanced budget.

Yoho also is opposed to raising the debt ceiling unless significant spending cuts are made; he is also opposed to earmarks in legislation. His district is one of the lowest-taxed in Florida, located primarily within Suwannee River Management District (lower proportion of property taxes), per capita retail sales in the district are significantly lower than the state average, and it has the fewest non-farm related businesses of Florida's congressional districts. Yoho has not made any indication on his level support of the farm bill.

In 2014, Yoho was challenged by conservative Republican Jake Rush for his seat. Rush painted Yoho as a "liberal" and appealed to voters' conservatism to try to win the Republican nomination.

In 2015, Yoho mounted a campaign to challenge John Boehner for the Speakership of the US House of Representatives in an attempt to get the conference to the second ballot. The bloc of dissenting members were four votes shy of achieving their goal.

He and his Democratic colleague John Conyers offered bipartisan amendments to block the U.S. military training of Ukraine's Azov Battalion of the Ukrainian National Guard. Some members of the battalion are openly white supremacists.

Controversies
While running for Congress in 2012, Yoho supported the controversial reduction of early voting by Florida Governor Rick Scott, though he stated it didn't reduce it enough. Yoho later joked that the right to vote was once limited exclusively to property owners. He also expressed support for the Bilderberg conspiracy theory.

In 2013, he became widely known for his position on breaching the debt ceiling and defaulting on the national debt, which he claimed "would bring stability to the world markets." This position was widely panned by Democrats and some Republicans such as fellow Republican Reid Ribble, who called the position "crazy talk."

Verbal assault 
In July 2020, Yoho accosted Congresswoman Alexandria Ocasio-Cortez over her public comments that an increase of crime in New York City was due to the high rise in poverty. According to a reporter from The Hill who overheard the conversation, the congressman called her "disgusting" and "out of your freaking mind." Ocasio-Cortez called him "rude," and reporters overheard Yoho calling her a "fucking bitch" as he walked away from the conversation. Ocasio-Cortez confirmed the incident on Twitter and on the House floor, but Yoho's office denied his comments, claiming that he "made a brief comment to himself as he walked away summarizing what he believes her policies to be: bullshit." He later addressed the incident on the House floor, saying, "Having been married for 45 years with two daughters, I'm very cognizant of my language. The offensive name calling, words attributed to me by the press were never spoken to my colleagues and if they were construed that way, I apologize for their misunderstanding."

Ocasio-Cortez addressed Congress and rebuked Yoho for having called her "a fucking bitch". In response, Ocasio-Cortez said, "Having a daughter does not make a man decent. Having a wife does not make a decent man. Treating people with dignity and respect makes a decent man." On July 25, 2020, Bread for the World, a Christian non-profit organization, announced Yoho would no longer serve on its board, noting that Yoho's "recent actions and words as reported in the media are not reflective of the ethical standards expected of members of our Board of Directors."

Legislation
During his first term of office, Yoho sponsored eighteen bills. One of the bills introduced during his first term, the Preventing Executive Overreach on Immigration Act of 2014, was passed by the House, but never voted on by the Senate.

Yoho co-authored the Veterinary Medicine Mobility Act of 2014 (H.R. 1528; 113th Congress), a bill that would amend the Controlled Substances Act to clarify that veterinarians are not required to have separate registrations to dispense controlled substances outside of their principal place of business, such as when treating animals on a farm.

Yoho is a co-sponsor of the Defund Planned Parenthood Act of 2015 (H.R. 3134). It has not moved since passing the House on September 18, 2015.

On June 9, 2016, Yoho voted Nay on the Puerto Rico Oversight, Management, and Economic Stability Act (PROMESA, H.R. 5278) to restructure Puerto Rican debt. The Republican-authored bill passed the House with bipartisan support.

Committee assignments
 Committee on Agriculture
 Subcommittee on Horticulture, Research, Biotechnology, and Foreign Agriculture
 Subcommittee on Livestock, Rural Development, and Credit
 Subcommittee on Nutrition
 Committee on Foreign Affairs
 Subcommittee on Asia and the Pacific
 Republican Study Committee

Caucus memberships
 United States Congressional International Conservation Caucus
 Freedom Caucus
 Veterinary Medicine Caucus

Political positions

Gun policy 
Yoho has stated that "the right to bear arms is a birthright and should never be threatened."
Yoho is a gun owner. He supports concealed carry laws and carries his gun with him when at home in Florida. Yoho has compared carrying a gun to carrying a cell phone in one's pocket. He says "I have the right to protect myself," regarding concealed carry and "I feel like I have a very good aim. My wife is better." He has co-sponsored bills to allow lawmakers to carry guns at the US Capitol and additional bills to allow individuals to carry guns nationwide, regardless of state law.
In 2012, Yoho stated, "I am proud to say I hold an A rating from the NRA".
From 2015 to 2016, Yoho accepted US$1,000 in direct campaign contributions from the National Rifle Association's Political Victory Fund; from 2012 to 2018, his total is US$4,000 from NRA sources.

In March 2017, Yoho voted in favor of the Veterans Second Amendment Protection Act, which would have allowed veterans who are considered "mentally incompetent" to purchase ammunition and firearms unless declared a danger by a judge.
The measure passed the House of Representatives, but ultimately stalled in the Senate. Yoho was one of the original co-sponsors of H.J.Res.40, which successfully used the Congressional Review Act to block implementation of an Obama-era amendment to the NICS Improvement Amendments Act of 2007 that was aimed at preventing the mentally-infirm from legally purchasing firearms.

LGBT rights 
Yoho has a "0" rating from the Human Rights Campaign, indicating an anti-LGBT voting history.

Abortion 
Yoho is anti-abortion. He believes there should be strict protection laws for fetuses. He has described abortion as a "hideous practice" which "needs to stop."

Foreign policy 
Yoho urged the Trump administration to impose sanctions against Chinese officials who are responsible for human rights abuses against the Uyghur Muslim minority in China's northwestern Xinjiang region. In March 2019, Yoho and other lawmakers wrote a letter to Secretary of State Mike Pompeo that read in part, "This issue is bigger than just China. It is about demonstrating to strongmen globally that the world will hold them accountable for their actions." He also delivered a speech on East Turkistan (Xinjiang) on the House floor, describing East Turkistan as an "occupied country" and condemned China for what he says is its genocide of Uyghurs, Kazakhs, Kyrgyz, and other Turkic peoples.

Drug policy 

Yoho has a "B" rating from NORML, indicating a mixed voting history regarding cannabis-related causes. Yoho is not against veterans having access to medical marijuana if recommended by their Veterans Health Administration doctor and if it is legal for medicinal purposes in their state of residence. He supports industrial hemp farming. He voted in favor of preventing the DEA from funding the stop of medical marijuana operations in the states where they are legally operating.

Economic issues 
Yoho voted in favor of the Tax Cuts and Jobs Act of 2017. Yoho acknowledges that the bill is "not perfect." He believes the bill will "simplify the tax code" and "lighten the burden on all Americans (including middle-class families)."

Lynching
On February 26, 2020, Yoho voted against making lynching a federal hate crime. He stated that he believed it was an "overreach of the federal government and tramples on states' rights to make their own legislation on the subject".

Texas v. Pennsylvania
In December 2020, Yoho was one of 126 Republican members of the House of Representatives who signed an amicus brief in support of Texas v. Pennsylvania, a lawsuit filed at the United States Supreme Court contesting the results of the 2020 presidential election, in which Joe Biden prevailed over incumbent Donald Trump.

Personal life
Yoho married his wife Carolyn when they were 19 years old. They have two daughters and a son. Yoho is Roman Catholic.

References

External links
 
 
 

1955 births
21st-century American politicians
American gun rights activists
American Roman Catholics
American veterinarians
Catholics from Florida
Living people
Male veterinarians
People from Gainesville, Florida
Politicians from Minneapolis
Republican Party members of the United States House of Representatives from Florida
Tea Party movement activists
University of Florida College of Agricultural and Life Sciences alumni